Ambroise Roux-Alphéran (1776–1858) was a French public official and historian.

Biography

Early life
Ambroise(-Thomas) Roux-Alphéran was born on 29 December 1776 in Aix-en-Provence.

Career
He served as clerk of the court of Aix-en-Provence under the Restoration.

Later, he quit his job and decided to spend his time studying and writing about the history of Aix-en-Provence. His numerous works are kept in the Bibliothèque Méjanes, the public library in Aix.

Personal life
He resided at 9, rue Longue-Saint-Jean, which was subsequently renamed in his honour.

He died on 8 February 1858 in Aix-en-Provence.

Works and themes
Ambroise Roux-Alphéran, Les Rues d'Aix (Aubin, 1848).

References

1776 births
1858 deaths
Writers from Aix-en-Provence
19th-century French historians
French male non-fiction writers